Jane M. Barnes (née Crowley) (January 4, 1928 – May 11, 2000) was an American politician.

Born in Chicago, Illinois, Barnes went to Notre Dame High School and Saint Xavier University. She lived in Palos Park, Illinois, and was involved with the Republican Party. From 1975 to 1993, Barnes served in the Illinois House of Representatives. Barnes died from cancer at her home in Palos Park, Illinois.

Notes

1928 births
2000 deaths
Politicians from Chicago
People from Palos Park, Illinois
Saint Xavier University alumni
Women state legislators in Illinois
Republican Party members of the Illinois House of Representatives
Deaths from cancer in Illinois
20th-century American politicians
20th-century American women politicians